ICHEP or International Conference on High Energy Physics is one of the most prestigious international scientific conferences in the field of particle physics, bringing together leading theorists and experimentalists of the world. It was first held in 1950, and is biennial since 1960. Since the first conferences of the series took place in Rochester, New York, the event is also commonly referred to as the Rochester conference.

Past conferences

I Rochester (1950)
II Rochester (1952)
III Rochester (1952)
IV Rochester (1954)
V Rochester (1955)
VI Rochester (1956)
VII Rochester (1957)
VIII Geneva (1958)
IX Kiev (1959)
X Rochester (1960)
XI Geneva (1962)
XII Dubna (1964)
XIII Berkeley (1966)
XIV Vienna (1968)
XV Kiev (1970)
XVI Chicago (1972)
XVII London (1974)
XVIII Tbilisi (1976)
XIX Tokyo (1978)
XX Madison (1980)
XXI Paris (1982)
XXII Leipzig (1984)
XXIII Berkeley (1986)
XXIV Munich (1988)
XXV Singapore (1990)
XXVI Dallas (1992)
XXVII Glasgow (1994)
XXVIII Warsaw (1996)
XXIX Vancouver (1998)
XXX Osaka (2000)
XXXI Amsterdam (2002)
XXXII Beijing (2004)
XXXIII Moscow (2006)
XXXIV Philadelphia (2008)
XXXV Paris (2010)
XXXVI Melbourne (2012)
XXXVII Valencia (2014)
XXXVIII Chicago (2016)
XXXIX Seoul (2018)
XL Prague (2020), virtual
XLI Bologna (2022)

References

External links
 https://twitter.com/pressichep

1950 establishments in New York (state)
Physics conferences
Recurring events established in 1950